The Naked Gun: From the Files of Police Squad! (also known as simply The Naked Gun) is a 1988 American crime comedy film directed by David Zucker and released by Paramount Pictures. The film stars Leslie Nielsen as the bumbling police lieutenant Frank Drebin. Priscilla Presley, Ricardo Montalbán, George Kennedy, and O. J. Simpson also star in supporting roles.

The film features fast-paced slapstick comedy, including many visual and verbal puns and gags. The film is based on the character portrayed by Nielsen in the television series Police Squad!, and is also a continuation of the latter. The core creative team behind Police Squad! and the film series includes the team of David Zucker, Jim Abrahams, and Jerry Zucker as well as Pat Proft in varying combinations.

Released on December 2, 1988, The Naked Gun was a critical and commercial success, which led to two sequels: The Naked Gun : The Smell of Fear (1991) and Naked Gun : The Final Insult (1994).

Plot
Police Squad Lieutenant Frank Drebin is on vacation in Beirut when he disrupts a conference of America's greatest enemies (Idi Amin, Muammar Gaddafi, Ayatollah Khomeini, Yasser Arafat, Fidel Castro, and Mikhail Gorbachev) who are trying to conceive a terrorist plan to humiliate the U.S. In Los Angeles, Officer Nordberg attempts to bust a heroin operation run by businessman Vincent Ludwig but is shot by Ludwig's henchmen. Drebin returns to L.A. and is briefed on the case before visiting Nordberg in the hospital. Nordberg provides cryptic clues, including a picture of Ludwig's ship on which the deal had been organized. Frank also learns that Nordberg's jacket tested positive for heroin.

Police Squad is put in charge of security for the visit of Queen Elizabeth II to Los Angeles, and Captain Ed Hocken tells Drebin that he has 24 hours to clear Nordberg before word gets out and detracts from the Queen's visit.

Drebin visits Ludwig to inquire about the ship and Ludwig learns that Nordberg is still alive. Ludwig asks his assistant Jane, who is unaware of Ludwig's criminal activities, to get close to Drebin and see what he knows.  Jane provides Drebin with information he requested and the two begin falling in love.  Ludwig meets with Pahpshmir, from the Beirut meeting, to discuss an assassination plot against the Queen. Ludwig agrees to do it for $20 million and explains that he will use a beeper that uses post-hypnotic suggestion to make anyone an unwitting assassin. Ludwig attempts to have Nordberg killed at the hospital by hypnotizing his doctor, but Drebin successfully protects Nordberg.  The doctor is killed in a comical fashion before Drebin can interrogate him.

Drebin then breaks into Ludwig's office to search for evidence. He finds a note from Pahpshmir to Ludwig which confirms his suspicions, but accidentally starts a fire that destroys the note and the office. Drebin later confronts Ludwig with his allegations at a reception for the Queen's arrival. He misinterprets Ludwig's presentation of a musket to the Queen as an attack and tries to protect her, but only causes more of a problem and is fired from Police Squad. Jane finds out the plan will be executed at a baseball game at Anaheim Stadium and that one of the players will perform the act.  She tells Drebin of the plan but he is forced to sneak into the game in disguise.

Police Squad arrives at the stadium and Drebin tells them about the plot. Drebin knocks the home plate umpire out and takes his place in order to frisk the players for weapons while they are at bat.  Ludwig eventually activates his assassin, Reggie Jackson. Jane alerts Drebin, who chases after Jackson and tackles him, causing a bench-clearing brawl that allows Jackson to escape. Ludwig holds Jane at gunpoint and begins to leave the stadium while Jackson takes aim at the Queen. Drebin tries to tranquilize Jackson, but misses and hits a large woman on the upper deck. She falls over the railing and lands on Jackson, crushing him and saving the Queen's life.

Drebin follows Ludwig to the top of the stadium and shoots him with another dart.  Ludwig falls over the side of the stadium and is struck by a passing bus, run over by a steamroller, and finally trampled by the USC marching band. Some of the band members inadvertently step on Ludwig's beeper, triggering Jane to attempt to kill Drebin.  He breaks Jane's hypnosis by openly professing his feelings for her and giving her an engagement ring. Drebin is reinstated to Police Squad and a recovered Nordberg congratulates him. Unfortunately, Drebin accidentally pushes Nordberg's wheelchair down the stadium stairs and launches him onto the field.

Cast

Major League Baseball (MLB) player Jay Johnstone has a cameo role as do umpires Joe West, Doug Harvey, Hank Robinson, Ken Kaiser and Ron Luciano. Professional announcers Curt Gowdy, Jim Palmer, Tim McCarver, Mel Allen, Dick Enberg, and Dick Vitale appear as play-by-play commentators. Dr. Joyce Brothers also appears in a cameo role as herself. John Houseman appears (uncredited) as a driving teacher.

Production
The film was shot at various locations in and around Los Angeles, California.

Principal photography was from February 22 to May 6, 1988.

The baseball matchup between the California Angels and Seattle Mariners was not originally planned. Being Wisconsin natives, the Zuckers and Abrahams made a request to MLB to allow them to use the Milwaukee Brewers as one of the teams, but was recommended the Mariners instead. Minnesota native Proft's attempt to make that team the Twins was rejected by the ballclub. The Mariners' opponent was supposed to have been the Los Angeles Dodgers who, despite its willingness to allow Dodger Stadium to be used for filming, refused to be mentioned in the film because of its objection to the bench-clearing brawl scene. Needing a home team based in Greater Los Angeles which was the film's setting, the writers successfully settled for the Angels.

Ricardo Montalbán was chosen by the producers to play the villain after being included on a list of names assembled by the people in charge of casting the film. The Zucker brothers had seen his performance in Star Trek II: The Wrath of Khan.

Reception

Critical response
Upon its initial release, The Naked Gun: From the Files of Police Squad! received critical acclaim, and has since been regarded as one of the greatest comedy films of all time. On Rotten Tomatoes, the film has a rating of 86%, based on 57 reviews, with an average rating of 7.5/10. The site's critical consensus reads, "The Naked Gun is chock full of gags that are goofy, unapologetically crass, and ultimately hilarious." On Metacritic, the film has a score of 76 out of 100, based on 13 critics, indicating "generally favorable reviews". Audiences polled by CinemaScore gave the film an average grade of "A−" on an A+ to F scale.

Roger Ebert of the Chicago Sun-Times gave the film three-and-a-half stars (of four), and said: "The movie is as funny, let it be said, as any comedy released this year ... You laugh, and then you laugh at yourself for laughing."

It was voted the 14th best comedy of all time in a Channel 4 poll. The film was selected by The New York Times as one of The Best 1,000 Movies Ever Made. It was named the 7th Funniest Comedy Ever on a poll by Empire.

Box office
The film was released on December 2, 1988, and in its opening weekend, finished in first place at the box office in the United States and Canada, grossing $9.3 million. In its second weekend, it grossed $6.1 million, falling to second place behind the newly released Twins ($11.2 million).

The film went on to gross $78.8 million at the United States and Canada box office and $73.7 million overseas for a worldwide total of $152.4 million.

See also
 Telefon (film)

References

External links

 
 
 
 
 

1988 films
1980s parody films
1980s police comedy films
1980s screwball comedy films
American crime comedy films
American slapstick comedy films
American screwball comedy films
American baseball films
Beirut in fiction
Cultural depictions of Elizabeth II
Cultural depictions of Fidel Castro
Cultural depictions of Idi Amin
Cultural depictions of Mikhail Gorbachev
Cultural depictions of Muammar Gaddafi
Cultural depictions of Ruhollah Khomeini
Cultural depictions of Yasser Arafat
Films scored by Ira Newborn
Films about Elizabeth II
Films directed by David Zucker (director)
Films set in Los Angeles
Paramount Pictures films
Films with screenplays by Jim Abrahams
Films with screenplays by David Zucker (filmmaker)
Films with screenplays by Jerry Zucker
Films with screenplays by Pat Proft
The Naked Gun
Los Angeles Angels
Seattle Mariners
1980s crime comedy films
1988 comedy films
Films shot in Los Angeles
Films about terrorism in the United States
Films about assassinations
Films set in Beirut
1980s English-language films
Films produced by Robert K. Weiss
1980s American films